Kehinde (Short for Omokehinde) is a given name of Yoruba origin meaning "the second-born of the twins" or the one who comes after Taiwo. Though Taiwo is the firstborn, it is believed that Kehinde is the elder twin, sending Taiwo into the world first to determine if it is time to be born.

Notable people with the name include:

Kehinde Andrews, British academic
Kehinde Sofola (1924-2007), Nigerian jurist
Kehinde Kamson (born 1961), Nigerian businesswoman
Stephen K. Amos (born 1967), British comedian
Kehinde Aladefa (born 1974), Nigerian hurdler
Kehinde Fadipe (born 1983), British actress
Kehinde Wiley (born 1977), American artist
Kehinde Fatai (born 1990), Nigerian-Romanian footballer
Kayswitch (born 1985), Nigerian artist
Kehinde Babatunde Victor Oladipo (born 1992), better known as Victor Oladipo, American basketball player
Lisa-Kaindé Díaz (born 1994), French-Cuban musician
Kehinde Bankole, Nigerian actress
Kehinde Okunoren (born, 1983), Nigerian fashion designer and businessman, one of The Okunoren Twins
Kehinde Lijadu (born 1948), of Nigerian singing duo the Lijadu Sisters
Temitope Kehinde Ajayi (born 1975) Nigerian, Ekiti State Entrepreneur.

Sometimes the name is also used in an Anglicised form as Kenny.  Notable people known with this name include:
Kenny Adeleke (born, 1983), Nigerian-American basketball player
Kenny Onatolu (born 1982), American football player
Kenny Ogungbe, Nigerian musician
Kenny Blaq, Nigerian comedian

See also
Taiwo
Ibeji

References

Yoruba given names